Terri Springett is a former England women's international footballer. She represented the England women's national football team at senior international level and spent most of her career at Howbury Grange.

Personal life

Terri Springett is the daughter of 1966 World Cup winner Ron Springett. Since retiring from professional football she is the club secretary for Queens Park Rangers.

Honours
Howbury Grange
 FA Women's Cup: 1984

References

Living people
FA Women's National League players
Fulham L.F.C. players
English women's footballers
Women's association football defenders
England women's international footballers
Year of birth missing (living people)